"The Dream of a Lifetime" is a 2002 Donald Duck comic by Don Rosa. The story was first published in the Danish Anders And & Co. #2002-49; the first American publication was in Uncle Scrooge #329, in May 2004.

It appeared in the May 2004 issue of the Scrooge McDuck comic book (Uncle Scrooge #329). 

It is famous for sharing many similarities with the blockbuster Christopher Nolan film Inception, which was released eight years later in 2010.

Plot
While Scrooge McDuck is having a dream, the Beagle Boys invade his dream, via a device stolen from Gyro Gearloose, in order to steal the combination to his money bin. Since it is extremely difficult for a dreamer to stop themselves from correctly answering questions posed to them in dreams (according to the in-story dream science), Donald Duck must enter his uncle Scrooge's dream to prevent Uncle Scrooge from blabbing the combination to the Beagle Boys.

Similarities with Inception
Several similarities have been noted to Christopher Nolan's film Inception, including the plot similarities of entering dreams to steal secrets and falling to exit dreams. The idea of Inception, however, was allegedly pitched to Warner Bros. by Nolan in 2001, while Rosa's comic was first published in 2002.

References

External links

Disney comics stories
Donald Duck comics by Don Rosa
2002 in comics
Comics about dreams